Benthonellania is a genus of minute sea snails, marine gastropod mollusks or micromollusks in the family Rissoidae.

Species
Species within the genus Benthonellania include:

 Benthonellania acuticostata (Dall, 1889)
 Benthonellania agastachys Bouchet & Warén, 1993
 Benthonellania coronata Absalão & Santos, 2004
 Benthonellania fayalensis (Watson, 1886)
 Benthonellania multicostata Absalão & Santos, 2004
 Benthonellania oligostigma Bouchet & Warén, 1993
 Benthonellania pyrrhias (Watson, 1886)
 Benthonellania xanthias (Watson, 1886)

References

External links
 

Rissoidae